William J. Hochul Jr. (born April 1, 1959) is an American lawyer who served as United States attorney for the Western District of New York from 2010 to 2016. Hochul has been the first gentleman of New York since August 2021, when his wife, Kathy Hochul, ascended to the governorship following the resignation of Andrew Cuomo. He was previously the second gentleman while his wife was lieutenant governor from 2015 to 2021.

Hochul is currently senior vice president, general counsel, and secretary to Delaware North, a Buffalo-based casino and hospitality company.

Early life and education 
William J. Hochul Jr. was born in Buffalo, New York in 1959. His grandparents were all Jewish immigrants from Poland. He graduated from Cheektowaga Central High School in Cheektowaga, New York, just outside Buffalo. Hochul earned a Bachelor of Arts degree from the University of Notre Dame in 1981 and a Juris Doctor from State University of New York at Buffalo in 1984. Hochul won the Law School's Moot Court competition. He also earned the Top Oralist award at the National Constitutional Moot Court Competition held in Chapel Hill, North Carolina, in 1982.

Career 
Hochul served as an assistant U.S. attorney in the Western District of New York from 1991 to 2010. During that time, he served as chief of the Anti-Terrorism Unit from 2002 to 2007 and as chief of the National Security Division from 2007 to 2010.

William J. Hochul Jr. was one of the 18 members of the Buffalo Joint Terrorism Task Force awarded the Attorney General's Award for Exceptional Service, the highest award of the Department of Justice, for "their exemplary performance in the dismantlement of the Lackawanna, New York terrorist cell" which resulted in the 2003 convictions of six Yemeni-American for providing material support to Al-Qaeda. Over his career, Hochul became one of the most highly-decorated federal prosecutors in the history of the Department of Justice, receiving over four dozen honors and awards for his work. Hochul is also generally recognized as the first prosecutor to use the nation's racketeering laws to dismantle violent street gangs.

In 2006, William J. Hochul Jr. unsuccessfully applied to a counterterrorism position in the Executive Office for United States Attorneys. A 2008 report by the Department of Justice Office of the Inspector General revealed that Hochul's appointment was one of several appointments that were inappropriately blocked by G.W. Bush's Department of Justice official Monica Goodling due to political considerations. The report found that Hochul was passed over in favor of "a much less experienced, but politically acceptable, attorney". Hochul, who has variously registered to vote as both an independent and Democrat, is married to Kathleen C. Hochul, a longtime, politically-active Democrat. The report concluded that Goodling found Hochul objectionable "because of his and his wife's political affiliation" and instead appointed a registered Republican who lacked counterterrorism experience and did not have the requisite five years of experience as a federal prosecutor.

On December 23, 2009, President Barack Obama nominated Hochul to serve as the United States attorney for the Western District of New York. He was confirmed by the United States Senate by unanimous consent on March 10, 2010. According to the Am-Pol Eagle, Hochul is the first Polish-American to serve as a federal prosecutor for Western New York State.

In 2016, Hochul became senior vice president, general counsel, and secretary to Delaware North, a hospitality and gambling company. Hochul speaks frequently on topics related to corporate culture, compliance, and governance issues. While at the Department of Justice, Hochul lectured frequently, domestically and abroad, on corruption and other criminal law and justice matters.

Personal life 
Hochul is married to former Congresswoman and current New York Governor Kathy Hochul, who previously served as the county clerk of Erie County, New York from 2007 to 2011. They have two children.

References

External links 
 Office of the Inspector General (July 2008). An Investigation of Allegations of Politicized Hiring by Monica Goodling and Other Staff in the Office of the Attorney General.

1959 births
Living people
Lawyers from Buffalo, New York
United States Attorneys for the Western District of New York
First ladies and gentlemen of New York (state)
University at Buffalo Law School alumni
University of Notre Dame alumni
American people of Polish-Jewish descent
20th-century American lawyers
21st-century American lawyers